Sir Watkin Williams-Wynn, 6th Baronet (22 May 1820 – 9 May 1885) was a Welsh Conservative Party politician who sat in the House of Commons from 1841 to 1885.

Biography

Williams-Wynn was born at the family's London property, the eldest son of Sir Watkin Williams-Wynn, 5th Baronet, and his wife Lady Henrietta Antonia Clive, eldest daughter of Edward Clive, 1st Earl of Powis. He was educated at Westminster School and Christ Church, Oxford. He was a cornet in the 1st Life Guards in 1839 and a lieutenant in 1842. He succeeded his father to the baronetcy on 6 January 1840. He was also at Magdalene College, Cambridge and graduated MA in 1842.

Williams-Wynn was elected Member of Parliament (MP) for Denbighshire in 1841 and held the seat until his death in 1885, aged 64. The seat had previously been held by his father, grandfather and great-grandfather, all of whom were also named Watkin Williams-Wynn.

Williams-Wynn was lieutenant colonel of the Montgomeryshire Yeomanry from 1844 to 1877 and of the 1st Denbighshire Rifle Volunteers from 1862 until his death. He was ADC to Queen Victoria in 1881. He hunted four days a week, having been appointed master of the hunt at 23. He was a director of the Great Western Railway. In 1845 he served as treasurer of the Salop Infirmary in Shrewsbury.

After Wynnstay was almost totally destroyed by fire in 1858, Sir Watkin rebuilt it between 1859 and 1865 on the same site, with Benjamin Ferrey as his architect.

Williams-Wynn married his cousin, Marie Emily Williams-Wynn, youngest daughter of Sir Henry Watkin Williams-Wynn, KCB, on 28 April 1852. He had two daughters, Marie Nesta Williams Wynn (23 October 1868 – 26 January 1883) who is commemorated by a stained glass window at Ruabon parish church, and Louisa Alexandra Williams Wynn (1864–1911), the sole heiress of the Wynnstay estate, who also married her cousin, Herbert Lloyd Watkin Williams-Wynn (1860–1944), who succeeded him as the 7th baronet on his death in 1885.

References

External links
 

1820 births
1885 deaths
Alumni of Magdalene College, Cambridge
Williams-Wynn, Sir Watkin, 6th Baronet
Conservative Party (UK) MPs for Welsh constituencies
British Life Guards officers
UK MPs 1837–1841
UK MPs 1841–1847
UK MPs 1847–1852
UK MPs 1852–1857
UK MPs 1857–1859
UK MPs 1859–1865
UK MPs 1865–1868
UK MPs 1868–1874
UK MPs 1874–1880
UK MPs 1880–1885
Directors of the Great Western Railway
Montgomeryshire Yeomanry officers